Riverboat is an American Western television series starring Darren McGavin and Burt Reynolds, produced by Revue Studios, and broadcast on the NBC television network from 1959 to 1961. Reynolds was replaced by Noah Beery Jr. halfway through the series in the wake of conflicts with McGavin.

Plot 
In the series, Captain Grey Holden and his crew navigate the vessel called the Enterprise principally along the Mississippi, Missouri, and Ohio Rivers. Some episodes are set in the eastern end of the American West or in the Midwest. Holden and his men encounter interesting characters along the way, including U.S. President Zachary Taylor, General Winfield Scott and a prepresidential Abraham Lincoln. One episode focuses indirectly on the Texan Revolution of 1836. Unlike most Westerns, which are set after the American Civil War, the story's time frame precedes the conflict, and includes the 1830s and the 1840s. The series ended on the NBC midseason schedule in January 1961, replaced by a drama about the sectional conflict, The Americans.

Cast
Darren McGavin played Captain Grey Holden for 40 episodes. Dan Duryea played Captain Brad Turner for two episodes while McGavin was embroiled in contract disputes. Burt Reynolds, in his television debut, played McGavin's partner and chief pilot Ben Frazer in 20 episodes, and was replaced by Noah Beery, Jr., who played Bill Blake, for Season Two.

Dick Wessel, as chief stoker Carney Kohler, was cast in 41 episodes, Jack Lambert was cast in 23 episodes as first mate Joshua MacGregor (having played a different character, Tony Walchek, earlier in the series), John Mitchum co-starred in 10 episodes as Pickalong, the ship's cook, Michael McGreevey was cast in 17 episodes as cabin boy Chip Kessler, and William D. Gordon played first mate Joe Travis in 13 episodes before his character's death.

Episodes

Season 1: 1959–60

Season 2: 1960–61

Guest stars

Female guest stars
The series featured an array of leading ladies of that era as guest stars, including Mary Tyler Moore, cast as the "Brunette Girl in Coach", with Jeanne Carmen as Janine, the "Blonde Girl in Coach", in the 1959 episode, "A Night at Trapper's Landing". Moore played Lily Belle de Lesseps the next year in "Trunk Full of Dreams" (1960).

Other female guest stars include:

Jeanne Bal
Jeanne Bates
Anne Baxter
Barbara Bel Geddes
Whitney Blake
Jocelyn Brando
Virginia Christine
Jeanne Crain
Norma Crane
Pat Crowley
Arlene Dahl
Dianne Foster
Mona Freeman
Beverly Garland
Connie Hines
Sherry Jackson
Bethel Leslie

Nan Leslie
Mercedes McCambridge
Patricia Medina
Vera Miles
Elizabeth Montgomery
Joanna Moore
Debra Paget
Suzanne Pleshette
Madlyn Rhue
Gena Rowlands
Fay Spain
Karen Steele
Jan Sterling
Stella Stevens
Barbara Stuart
Gloria Talbott

Male guest stars
Many male guest stars also appeared on Riverboat. Ricardo Montalbán portrayed United States Army Lt. Andre B. Devereaux in "A Night at Trapper's Landing" (November 8, 1959). In the story line, the Enterprise is commandeered by the military for a punitive expedition against the Indians after an attack on Devereaux and his men. Ben Frazer, however, tries to convince the Army that the uprising is really the result of a local Indian agent. The episode features Judson Pratt, as Sergeant Ned Bolger, Stacy Harris as Colonel Nicholson, and Raymond Bailey as General Jacoby, with other roles for character actors Morris Ankrum, R.G. Armstrong, and Peter Whitney.

Other male guest stars include:
 Eddie Albert, as Dan Simpson, with Russell Johnson as Darius, and John M. Pickard, from the Western series Boots and Saddles, uncredited as a river pirate, in "The Unwilling" (1959): In the story line, Dan Simpson attempts to open a general store despite a raid from pirates who stole $20,000 in merchandise. Debra Paget is cast as Lela Russell.
 Jack Albertson, as Sampson J. Binton, and DeForest Kelley as Alex Jeffords, in the series finale, "Listen to the Nightingale" (1961): Holden and Blake transport an opera singer (Jeanne Bal) and her musicians to New Orleans in exchange for a share of her concert receipts.
 Robert Bray, prior to Stagecoach West, as Tom Byson, with Beverly Garland as Dr. Nora James, in "Three Graves" (1960), the story of three mysterious recent graves in a river town.
 Charles Bronson, as Crowley, with Ray Teal as Sheriff Clay, in "Zigzag" (1960): Bill Blake (Noah Beery Jr.) is at a doctor's office in a river town when he is abducted by three outlaws who think that Blake is the doctor. The outlaws then demand that Blake pretend to be the son of a dying old man so he can compel the man to reveal the location of a large amount of money in his possession. William Fawcett is cast as Pinty Walters, the owner of the cabin where the old man is living. Stella Stevens plays Pinty's daughter, Lisa.
 Edgar Buchanan, as Wingate Pritchard Pardee in "Duel on the River" (1960): Holden and his crew come between Brian Cloud (Robert Emhardt), a regional cotton baron, and a dissident grower, Beaudry Rawlings (Claude Akins), and Beaudry's ambitious wife, Laurie (Fay Spain), who is a cousin of Pardee's. Akins also appeared as Jarret Sutton in "Escape to Memphis" (1959); Sutton pursues his former sister-in-law Laura Sutton (Jeanne Crain), a passenger on the Enterprise, who has killed her husband (his brother) in self-defense. Forrest Lewis appears in this episode as Mr. Chambers.
 Richard Carlson, as Paul Drake in "The Faithless" (1959): Drake is an escaped prisoner with medical training being transported on the Enterprise back to jail. Having lost his religious faith, Drake refuses to render medical assistance to a two-year-old girl stricken with a communicable disease that threatens the entire vessel. William Phipps and Jeanne Bates play the parents of the child. Bethel Leslie portrays Cathy Norris.
 Anthony Caruso, as the Cherokee Chief White Bull in "The Long Trail" (1960): A group of Indians is being transported on the Enterprise, rather than walking the Trail of Tears to their reservation in Indian Territory. Harry Lauter and Dennis Cross also appear in this episode.
 Richard Chamberlain, as Lt. Dave Winslow in "Chicota Landing" (1960): In the story line, Juan Cortilla, a Mexican bandit played by Joe De Santis, is stormed from jail. Lieutenant Winslow asks Holden to transport Cortilla and his men to a military garrison.  Instead, Cortilla takes over the Enterprise and its gunpowder. Connie Hines portrays Lucy Bridges, and Ted de Corsia is cast as another bandit.
 Lloyd Corrigan, as John Jenkins, with Anne Baxter as Ellie Jenkins, in "A Race to Cincinnati" (1959): Three ruthless men try to prevent a peach farmer from getting his crop to market in Cincinnati: He will lose his valuable land if he cannot make the last payment to his creditors.
Francis De Sales, as Ed Baker, with child actor Tom Nolan as Tommy Jones, a stowaway, in "The Boy from Pittsburgh" (1959): Series character Grey Holden transports a box of diamonds,  not knowing that a pickpocket has taken the gems and switched the contents of the box. King Donovan is cast as Paddy Britt; Mona Freeman is Louise Rutherford, a beautiful young widow; Robert Emhardt is Jeb Carter.
 Dan Duryea, as Captain Brad Turner, in "The Wichita Arrows" (1960):  Turner is in temporary command of the Enterprise while Grey Holden is recruiting new customers. Turner stops at a river town to collect fur pelts, but finds the proprietors of the establishment all dead with arrows in their backs. In the following episode, "Fort Epitaph" (1960), Captain Turner takes a cargo of cannon to a fort on the Little Missouri River within hostile Sioux country. Turner soon finds that the once-peaceful Indians have been driven to rebellion by the tough commander of the fort, who commandeers the Enterprise and orders its crew to attack the Sioux.
 Buddy Ebsen, as Niles Cox, with Gregory Walcott as Salem Cox, in "The Water of Gorgeous Springs" (1960): Two hillbilly families, the Coxes and the Jenningses, are engaged in a murderous feud aboard the Enterprise on which they find themselves as unlikely traveling companions. Barry Atwater is cast as Gould Jennings, Joycelyn Brando is Charity Jennings, and Sherry Jackson is Inez Cox. Less than two years later, Buddy Ebsen rocketed to national stardom in the CBS sitcom, The Beverly Hillbillies. This episode aired the night before the 1960 presidential election.
Gene Evans, as Sgt. Dan Phillips, James Griffith as Crpl. Sam Giler, Ron Hagerthy as Phelan, and Stuart Randall as General Winfield Scott in "The Quota" (1960): Sergeant Phillips shanghais Holden and a crew member to meet the Army's "quota" of new recruits.
 Paul Fix, known as Sheriff Micah Torrance on The Rifleman, as President Taylor in "That Taylor Affair" (1960), with Arlene Dahl as Lucy Belle.
 Bruce Gordon, as Garnett in "Forbidden Island" (1960), the story of Cajun outlaws who inhabit a remote island.
Clu Gulager, prior to his role as Billy the Kid on NBC's The Tall Man, as Beau Chandler, and Kevin Hagen as John Hollister, in "Jessie Quinn" (1959), a tale of intrigue involving the Texas Revolution: Holden attempts to send weapons to Sam Houston, but forces of Antonio Lopez de Santa Anna in Mexico threaten to blow up the Enterprise to prevent the delivery. Mercedes McCambridge is cast in the title role of this episode.
John Ireland, as Chris Slade, and Karl Swenson as Ansel Torgin, in "The Fight Back" (1959): Young Tom Fowler (Tom Laughlin) has made himself the boss of Hampton, a corrupt river town near Vicksburg. Fowler blocks farmers from shipping their crops to market. In a dispute over a wedding held on the Enterprise, a lynch mob led by Fowler comes after Holden.
Douglas Kennedy, as McLeigh in "The Night of the Faceless Men" (1960): Broadcaster Hugh Downs portrays Dan Flynn; Frank Ferguson is cast as Roger. In the story line, while he is seeking to purchase wood, Holden encounters a river town in the clutches of hooded racketeers.
George Kennedy, as Gunner Slagle, with Slim Pickens as Porter Slagle; Dennis O'Keefe as boxing promoter Dan Muldoon, and Norma Crane as Sarah Prentice, in "River Champion" (1960), a story about a prize fight aboard the Enterprise.
Sandy Kenyon, as lawyer Abraham Lincoln, with Tyler McVey as a judge and Denver Pyle as Jim Bledsoe, in "No Bridge on the River" (1960): Holden sues the railroad when the Enterprises on a dark and stormy night strikes a rail bridge atop the Mississippi River; Lincoln is the attorney representing the railroad.
Dayton Lummis, as Gideon Templeton in "Path of the Eagle" (1960); a group of wealthy travelers hire Grey Holden to transport them to Independence, Missouri, where they will join a wagon train to the West. One of their party, however, conspires with river pirates to hijack the Enterprise and rob the passengers. Dianne Foster appears as Marian Templeton, with Myron Healey as Steven Barrows. 
Raymond Massey, prior to the television series Dr. Kildare, as Sir Oliver Garnett in "Trunk Full of Dreams" (1960): The Enterprise becomes a floating theater when a group of actors comes on board. Bethel Leslie is cast as Juliet, Willard Waterman is de Lesseps, Mary Tyler Moore is Lily Belle, and Robert Foulk is Captain Smiley.
Doug McClure, prior to The Virginian, as  Corporal Jenkins in "The Face of Courage" (1959): Amid the threat of Sioux attack, the Enterprise is commandered by Sergeant Major Carmody (Paul Birch) while it is delivering military cargo to an Army outpost on the Missouri River. Joanna Moore appears in this episode as Kitty McGuire.
Stephen McNally as Jeb Randall, with Stuart Randall as Harry, in "Hang the Men High" (1960): Based on the word of a dying man, two passengers are seized from the Enterprise and tried before a kangaroo court. Walter Sande is cast as Tom Feller and Karen Steele is Sue Parker.
Read Morgan, as Clint Casey in "The Barrier" (1959): Passengers included a young man on assignment to become an Indian agent in the West and the miscreant who tries to bribe the agent to allow liquor sales on the reservation. William Bendix is cast as Vance Muldoon, and Elizabeth Montgomery is Mrs. Abigai Carruthers.
Ed Nelson, prior to Peyton Place, as Tim Tyler in "The Quick Noose" (1960): Enterprise crew member Carney Kohler could hang for the fatal stabbing of the son of Judge Wingate. The murderer used Kohler's knife to carry out the crime. Willis Bouchey plays the judge.
 Vincent Price, as Otto Justin in "Witness No Evil" (1959): Justin is transporting exotic animals on the  Enterprise, from Natchez, Mississippi, for use in a traveling circus headquartered in St. Louis, Missouri. One of the animals, Koko the Ape, can steal passengers' valuables from their rooms and then flee at will.
Cliff Robertson, as Martinus Van Der Brig, with Robert J. Wilke as Red Dog Hanlon, in "End of a Dream" (1960): Con man Van Der Brig persuades Holden to transport a group of pioneers to "Rolling Stone", a tract of land which he recently purchased, but cannot match the expectations of the settlers.
Lee Van Cleef, as Luke Cragg in "Strange Request" (1959): Jan Sterling as actress Lorna Langton charters the Enterprise for a trip to an abandoned trading post, where she retrieves a boy being held by river pirates who claim that he had been rescued from Indians. Lawrence Dobkin is cast as David Fields; Rhys Williams, as Josiah Cragg.
Robert Vaughn, as the lead in "About Roger Mowbray" (1959): Cassie Baird (Madlyn Rhue), a former girlfriend of Roger Mowbray's, tells Mrs. Jeanette Mowbray (Vera Miles) that Roger married her for her money. Roger learns that his father is also undermining his marriage. John Hoyt is cast as Antoine Rigaud.
Will Wright, curmudgeonly character actor, as J.C. Sickel, with Aldo Ray as Hunk Farber, John Larch as Touhy, and Barbara Bel Geddes as Missy, in "Payment in Full" (1959): Farber betrays his friend and employer to collect reward money, which he uses to court his girlfriend, Missy.

Production
NBC hoped the series would defeat Maverick, a Western series which star James Garner would leave for a major theatrical film career a season later and be replaced by Roger Moore. Riverboat was described as "Wagon Train on water." Darren McGavin was known from playing Mickey Spillane and Burt Reynolds was cast for romantic interest.

"We've spent a lot of money and put a lot of time into making it a quality show," said McGavin.

Home media
On October 30, 2007, Timeless Media Group released a three-disc best-of set featuring 15 episodes from the series.

On May 15, 2012, Timeless Media Group released Riverboat- The Complete Series on DVD in Region 1.

Reception

Critical
The New York Times called the pilot "labored and dull".

The Los Angeles Times said it was "produced with the slick vacuity of a B movie with pleasantly inconsequential stories and an utter disregard for the color and background that the Riverboat called for."

Ratings
The premiere episode rated 11.9 against Maverick'''s 22.9 and a rerun of That's My Boy with 7.5.

In January 1960, the series was shifted from Sunday nights to Monday.

References

 McNeil, Alex. Total Television  (1996). New York: Penguin Books 
 Brooks, Tim and Marsh, Earle, The Complete Directory to Prime Time Network and Cable TV Shows (1999). New York: Ballantine Books 

Further readingRiverboat: The Evolution of a Television Series,'' by S. L. Kotar and J. E. Gessler. 2010. Albany, BearManor Media. .

External links
 

NBC original programming
1959 American television series debuts
1961 American television series endings
1950s Western (genre) television series
Television series set in the 1830s
Television series set in the 1840s
Black-and-white American television shows
English-language television shows
Television series by Universal Television
1960s Western (genre) television series
Works set on boats
Nautical television series